Thuborough (alias Therborough, Theoburgh, etc.) in the parish of Sutcombe, Devon, England, is an historic estate, formerly a seat of a branch of the Prideaux family, also seated at Orcharton, Modbury; Adeston, Holbeton; Soldon, Holsworthy; Netherton, Farway; Ashburton; Nutwell, Woodbury; Ford Abbey, Thorncombe, all in Devon and at Prideaux Place, Padstow and Prideaux Castle, Luxulyan, in Cornwall. The present mansion house, comprising "Thuborough House" and "Thuborough Barton", the north-east block, is a grade II listed building.

Descent

Brictwold
The Anglo-Saxon holder of the estate of Teweberie (in the hundred of Black Torrington) immediately prior to the Norman Conquest of 1066 was Bristvold, as recorded in the Domesday Book of 1086, the standardised spelling of which name is Brictwold. A man named Brictwold, spelled variously as Bristvold, Brictvold, Bristvoldus, Bristoald, Brictwold, etc., held 11 other estates in Devon as listed in the Domesday Book, namely:
Stoodleigh in the parish of West Buckland
Plaistow in the parish of Shirwell
Varley in the parish of Marwood
Poulston in the parish of Halwell
Bradninch, now a parish
Parracombe in the parish of Shirwell
Churchill in the parish of East Down
Beare, of uncertain location
Flete
Twitchen in the parish of Arlington
Staplehill in the parish of Ilsington

de Aumale
The manor of Teweberie was held in 1086 by Robert de Aumale (fl. 1086) (Latinised to de Albemarle), one of the Devon Domesday Book tenants-in-chief of King William the Conqueror (1066-1087). His tenant was a certain Franco. Robert's lands, comprising 17 entries in the Domesday Book of 1086,  later formed part of the very large Feudal barony of Plympton, whose later barons were the Courtenay family, Earls of Devon. Robert was lord of Aumale in Normandy, now in the département of Seine-Maritime, France. As recorded in the 12th/13th century Book of Fees, a later tenant of the estate of Thefebergh, but holding it from the feudal barony of Plympton, was a certain Ralph de Alba Mara, whose relationship to Robert de Aumale is unrecorded. Ralph also held the estate of Kismeldon in West Putford.

de Esse/Ashe

The de Esse or de Ashe/Aysshe family took its surname from one of the many ancient estates in Devon named Esse/Ash. A branch of the family survived seated at the manor of Sowton (alias Clist Fomeson/Somson) until the 18th century. The arms of this family were: Argent, two chevrons sable, and "were quartered by several worthy families" according to the Devon historian Tristram Risdon (d.1640), who recorded the following descent of the manor of Therborough:
Sir Ralph de Esse, tempore King Henry III (1216-1272)
Sir Alan de Esse, tempore King Richard II (1377-1399), who left two daughters and co-heiresses:
Ingaret de Esse, eldest daughter, heiress of Thuborough, wife firstly of Andrew Giffard and secondly wife of Richard Halse of Kennedon
Elizabeth de Esse, wife of John Giffard of Helland, Cornwall.

Giffard
The descent of Thuborough in the Giffard family was as follows:
Andrew Giffard, second son of John II Giffard of Halsbury in the parish of Parkham, Devon, by his wife Jone Deuclive, daughter and heiress of Richard Deuclive.
John Giffard *(son) of Thuborough, who married Alice Ugworthy, a daughter and co-heiress of John Ugworthy.
Stephen Giffard (fl. 1438) (son) of Thuborough who married firstly to Joan Spencer, daughter and heiress of John Spencer of Spencer Combe, Tedburn St Mary, near Crediton.

Sources
Vivian, Lt.Col. J.L., (Ed.) The Visitations of the County of Devon: Comprising the Heralds' Visitations of 1531, 1564 & 1620, Exeter, 1895, pp. 618–620, pedigree of Prideaux of Adeston and Thuborough

References

Historic estates in Devon